The 2019 European Baseball Championship was an international baseball tournament organized by the Confederation of European Baseball. The 2019 Championship was held September 7–15, 2019, in Bonn and Solingen, Germany.

The tournament contributed towards qualification to the 2020 Summer Olympics, with the top five teams and Team South Africa competing at the European-African qualifier for the 2020 Summer Olympics, which was played in September 2019 in Bologna and Parma, Italy.

Qualification 

The top 10 teams of the 2016 European Championship qualified automatically for the tournament. Two additional teams, Austria and Israel, qualified from the 14-team B-Pool tournament.

Round 1

Pool A

Standings 

1 game suspended on September 7, 2019 in the 9th due to darkness (Ned led 10 – 2).

Pool B

Standings

Play-offs

Quarterfinals 
Order of games can change after round robin

Semifinals

Bronze

Final

Placement Round 5th–8th place

Classification Games

5th place 

Note: There was no game for 7th place.

Placement Round 9th–12th Place / Relegation Round 
There was a scheduling mistake in this placement/relegation round: the first two games, it should have been A5-B6 and B5-A6, instead it was A5-B5 and A6-B6.

Relegation round 

The loser of the above game is in 12th place and is relegated.

The loser of the above game is in 11th place and is relegated.

9th place

Final standings

Statistics leaders

Batting

* Minimum 2.7 plate appearances per game

Pitching

* Minimum 1.0 inning pitched per game

References

External links 
Official website 
Official stats website

 
2019
European Championships
European Baseball Championship
Sports competitions in North Rhine-Westphalia
International sports competitions hosted by Germany
European Baseball Championship